"Send Me Down to Tucson" is a song recorded by American country music artist Mel Tillis.  It was released in January 1979 as the first single from the album Are You Sincere.  The song reached #2 on the Billboard Hot Country Singles & Tracks chart.  The song was written by Snuff Garrett and Cliff Crofford.

Charts

Weekly charts

Year-end charts

References

1979 singles
1979 songs
Mel Tillis songs
Songs written by Snuff Garrett
Song recordings produced by Jimmy Bowen
MCA Records singles
Songs about Arizona